The 1910 Colgate football team was an American football team that represented Colgate University as an independent during the 1910 college football season. In its first season under head coach Laurence Bankart, the team compiled a 4–2–1 record. Clarence Turner was the team captain. The team played its home games on Whitnall Field in Hamilton, New York.

Schedule

References

Colgate
Colgate Raiders football seasons
Colgate football